Viktor Vorobiyev is a Soviet sprint canoer who competed in the mid to late 1970s. He won a complete of medals at the ICF Canoe Sprint World Championships with a gold (K-2 500 m: 1975), a silver (K-2 500 m: 1977), and a bronze (C-2 10000 m: 1978).

References

Living people
Soviet male canoeists
Year of birth missing (living people)
Russian male canoeists
ICF Canoe Sprint World Championships medalists in Canadian
ICF Canoe Sprint World Championships medalists in kayak